The Keisei Hai Autumn Handicap (Japanese 京成杯オータムハンデキャップ) is a Grade 3 horse race for Thoroughbreds aged three and over, run in September over a distance of 1600 metres on turf at Nakayama Racecourse.

It was first run in 1956 and has held Grade 3 status since 1984. The race was switched back and forth between Nakayama and Tokyo and run over several different distances in its early years before settling at its current venue and distance in 1984. The 1988 edition however took place at Niigata Racecourse.

Winners since 2000

Earlier winners

 1984 - Yoshido Eden
 1985 - Erebus
 1986 - Island Goddess
 1987 - Dyna Gulliver
 1988 - Hokuto Helios
 1989 - Material
 1990 - Oratorio
 1991 - Valiente
 1992 - Toshi Green
 1993 - Meistersinger
 1994 - Sakura Chitose O
 1995 - Dojima Muteki
 1996 - Crown City
 1997 - Kurokami
 1998 - Shinko Splendor
 1999 - Sunrise Atlas

See also
 Horse racing in Japan
 List of Japanese flat horse races

References

Turf races in Japan